NA-90 Mianwali-II is a constituency for the National Assembly of Pakistan.

Area
Some areas of Mianwali Tehsil
Piplan Tehsil

Members of Parliament

1970—1977: NW-45 Mianwali-II

1977: NA-61 Mianwali-II

1985: NA-61 Mianwali-cum-Bhakkar

1988—2002: NA-54 Mianwali-I

2002-2018: NA-72 Mianwali-II

2018-2022: NA-96 Mianwali-II

Election 2002 

General elections were held on 10 Oct 2002. Sher Afgan Khan Niazi of Pakistan Peoples Party Parliamentarian (PPPP) won by 50,210 votes.

Election 2008 

The result of the 2008 Pakistani general election in this constituency is given below.

Result 
Humair Hayat Khan Rokhri succeeded in the 2008 election and became the member of National Assembly.

Election 2013 

General elections were held on 11 May 2013. Amjad Ali Khan Niazi of the Pakistan Tehreek-e-Insaf won by 126,088 votes and became the  member of National Assembly.

Election 2018 

General elections were held on 25 July 2018.

By-election 2023 
A by-election will be held on 19 March 2023 due to the resignation of Amjad Ali Khan Niazi, the previous MNA from this seat.

See also
NA-89 Mianwali-I
NA-91 Bhakkar-I

References

External links 
Election result's official website

NA-072